Knowlton may refer to:

People
Knowlton (surname), any of several people with the surname
Justice Knowlton (disambiguation)
Knowlton Ames (1868-1931), US athlete in football
Knowlton Nash (1927-2014), Canadian newsman
E. Knowlton Fogg (1837-1900), US businessman

Places

United Kingdom
Knowlton Circles, a complex of henges and earthworks in Dorset
Knowlton Court, a country estate in Kent
Knowlton, Dorset, a former ecclesiastical and civil parish in Woodlands, Dorset
Knowlton Hundred, an area in Dorset County
Knowlton, Kent a parish in England
Knowlton railway station, a stop on the East Kent Light Railway from 1916 until 1948

United States

Structures
Knowlton Hall, a building complex on the Austin E. Knowlton School (Columbus, Ohio)
Knowlton Hat Factory, an historic structure in Ashford, Connecticut
Ebenezer Knowlton House, an historic structure in Montville, Maine
Knowlton Mansion, an historic structure in Philadelphia, Pennsylvania
Knowlton Memorial Hall, a museum in Ashford, Connecticut

Inhabited places
Knowlton (CDP), Wisconsin, a census-designated area in Marathon County, Wisconsin
Knowlton, Wisconsin, a town in Marathon County, Wisconsin
Knowlton Township, New Jersey, a township in Warren County, New Jersey

Canada
Knowlton, Quebec, a village in Brome Lake, in the Montérégie region of Quebec

Other uses
Hill & Knowlton, a New York City-based global public relations company
Knowlton's Rangers, an early US military intelligence group